Van Buren is a Dutch surname meaning "of/from Buren".  is also the Dutch word for "neighbours".

People
 Abigail Van Buren, pen name of the writer(s) of the "Dear Abby" column
 Adeline and Augusta Van Buren, the Van Buren sisters, Australian transcontinental motorcyclists
 Amelia Van Buren (c. 1856–1942), American photographer
 Andrew Van Buren, British performer who specialises in magic, large scale-illusions and juggling
 Anita Van Buren, a fictional character on the television show Law & Order
 Ebert Van Buren (1924–2019), American-Honduran football player
 Edith Van Buren (1858–1914), American socialite and traveler
 Elizabeth Douglas Van Buren (1881–1961), British archaeologist
 James Lyman Van Buren (1837-1866), American army officer and general after the American Civil War
 Jermaine Van Buren (born 1980), Major League Baseball player
 John Van Buren (US representative) (1799–1855), U.S. Representative from New York
 John D. Van Buren (1838–1918), an American civil engineer, naval engineer, lawyer, and politician
 John J. Van Buren (1915–1942), a U.S. Navy officer and pilot who received the Navy Cross and Distinguished Flying Cross
 Mabel Van Buren (1878–1947), American stage and screen actress
 Martin Van Buren (1782–1862), eighth president of the United States (1837–1841)
 Hannah Van Buren (1783–1819), his wife
 Abraham Van Buren II (1807–1873), his eldest son 
 Angelica Van Buren (1818–1877), his daughter-in-law (performed the ceremonial duties of First Lady)
 John Van Buren (1810–1866), his second son
 Abraham Van Buren I (1737 - 1817), his father
 Mick van Buren (born 1992), Dutch footballer
 Paul Van Buren, Christian theologian and author of the Secular Meaning of the Gospel 
 Raeburn van Buren (1891–1987) American magazine and comic strip illustrator 
 Steve Van Buren (1920–2012), professional American football player
 William Holme Van Buren (1819–1883), American surgeon

Dutch Royal Family
The name (van) "Buren" appears in the history of the Dutch royal house, being the family name of Anna van Egmond en Buren, the first wife of William I of Orange. Borrowing from this heritage, the Dutch royal family have used Count of Buren as a title or the surname "van Buren" in situations requiring anonymity.

 Princess Beatrix (formerly Queen Beatrix), the Countess of Buren (Dutch Gravin van Buren). 
 King Willem-Alexander used the alias "Alexander van Buren" or a variant for anonymity purposes. For example during his University application he used "Alex van Buren". He also registered for the 1986 elfstedentocht as "W A van Buren".

See also 
 Van Buuren (surname), Dutch surname of the same origin and pronunciation
 Van Beuren, form of the surname that probably originated in the US

Dutch-language surnames
Jewish surnames
Surnames of Dutch origin